The Ethics of Diet: A Catena of Authorities Deprecatory of the Practice of Flesh-eating is an 1883 book by Howard Williams, on the history of vegetarianism. The book was influential on the development of the Victorian vegetarian movement.

Summary 
The book tells the history of vegetarianism since the writings of the first Pythagorean philosophers of the Ancient World until the author's time. Among the authors mentioned in the book are: Ovid, Plutarch, Porphyry, Luigi Cornaro, Michel de Montaigne, John Ray, Voltaire, Alexander Pope, Percy Shelley, Alphonse de Lamartine, Joseph Ritson, and Gustav Struve. Not all authors mentioned in the book were vegetarians (Thomas More, for example, was probably not a vegetarian), but they all had critical views of meat-eating.

Reception 
The Ethics of Diet has been recognised as providing important momentum for the Victorian vegetarian movement. It was influential for many contemporary leading vegetarians, including Mohandas Gandhi, Leo Tolstoy, Henry Stephens Salt, and Jaime de Magalhães Lima (a Tolstoyan).

Gandhi, who met Williams in Ventnor, wrote in his autobiography: My faith in vegetarianism grew on me from day to day. Salt's book Plea for Vegetarianism whetted my appetite for dietetic studies. I went in for all books available on vegetarianism and read them. One of these, Howard Williams' The Ethics of Diet, was a 'biographical history of the literature of humane dietetics from the earliest period to the present day'.Tolstoy considered it an "excellent book", asserting that "The precise reason why abstinence from animal food will be the first act of fasting and of a moral life is admirably explained in the book, The Ethics of Diet; and not by one man only, but by all mankind in the persons of its best representatives during all the conscious life of humanity." Henry Stephens Salt commented that "Of all recent books on the subject of animals' rights this is by far the most scholarly and exhaustive". Jaime de Magalhães Lima, used Williams' book as a reference to write his 1912 conference O Vegetarismo e a Moralidade das raças.

Editions 
In 1892, a Russian translation was published with a foreword by Tolstoy titled "The First Step". A Swedish translation by Victor Pfeiff, was published in Stockholm in 1900.

In 1896, an updated edition appeared with a new title The Ethics of Diet: A Biographical History of the Literature of Human Dietetics, From the Earliest Period to the Present Day and additional material (chapters on Asoka, Oliver Goldsmith, Henry David Thoreau, Richard Wagner, and Anna Kingsford, among others). In 1907, Albert Broadbent published an abridged edition. The book later became a rarity, only available in certain libraries.

In 2003, the University of Illinois Press published a new edition of the book, edited by the ecofeminist author Carol J. Adams, with an additional introduction. Adams describes Williams' book as successfully managing to "reinstate vegetarianism as an ethical imperative within history by giving it a history".

References

Further reading

External links 
 The Ethics of Diet at the Internet Archive
  

1883 non-fiction books
Books about animal rights
English non-fiction books
Ethics books
History books about vegetarianism